Daniil Shapko (born 29 April 2001) is a Belarusian professional footballer who plays for Maxline on loan from Dinamo Minsk.

References

External links 
 
 

2001 births
Living people
Belarusian footballers
Association football goalkeepers
FC Dinamo Minsk players
FC Smorgon players
FC Dnepr Rogachev players